Adrian Lungu (born September 5, 1960) is a Romanian former rugby union player. He played 76 times as a center or wing for the Romanian national team. He is the father of Remus Lungu, who is himself a rugby union international.

Born in Năvodari, Constanța County, Lungu played for Locomoticva Bucuresti, and then for Steaua București with whom he won two SuperLiga titles in 1980, 1981. He also played for Farul Constanţa and Dinamo București. He made his international debut against Italy in 1980. In 1993, Adrian played for Castres when they won the French championship who beat Grenoble 14-11 in the final, in a match decided by an irregular try accorded by the referee.

At international level, Lungu took part at the 1987 and 1991 World Cups before retiring at thirty-four at the Rugby World Cup in South Africa. His final game was against Australia on June 3, 1995.

After his retirement, he coached the youth team of Castres.

References

External links

 Adrian Lungu International Statistics

1960 births
Living people
People from Năvodari
Romanian rugby union players
Romanian rugby union coaches
Rugby union wings
Rugby union centres
Castres Olympique players
Romania international rugby union players
Romanian expatriate rugby union players
Expatriate rugby union players in France
Romanian expatriate sportspeople in France